First Baptist Church of Watkins Glen is a historic Baptist church located at Watkins Glen in Schuyler County, New York.  It was built in 1888 and is a Victorian era religious building distinguished by a variety of vernacular Romanesque Revival and Queen Anne style inspired design and decorative detail.  The brick structure rests on a raised stone foundation and features a large front corner tower. The architects were Pierce & Dockstader of Elmira.

It was listed on the National Register of Historic Places in 2001.

References

Churches on the National Register of Historic Places in New York (state)
Baptist churches in New York (state)
Churches completed in 1888
19th-century Baptist churches in the United States
Churches in Schuyler County, New York
National Register of Historic Places in Schuyler County, New York